Hubert Murray Burge  (9 August 1862 – 11 June 1925) was an Anglican clergyman, headmaster of Winchester College, Bishop of Southwark, and Bishop of Oxford.

Life
Burge was born in 1862 and educated at Bedford School, Marlborough, and University College, Oxford. His first post after graduation was as a schoolmaster at  Wellington College after which he was Fellow and Dean of his old college. In March 1902 he graduated as a Bachelor of Divinity (BD) and at the same time was given a Doctorate of Divinity (DD).

Burge was Headmaster of Repton School from 1900 to 1901 and then of Winchester from 1901 to 1911, before his elevation to the episcopate as Bishop of Southwark in 1911. It was a surprise appointment because Burge had had no parochial experience and his health was fragile, and the Southwark diocese was regarded as very demanding for a diocesan Bishop.

During the First World War, Burge emphasised the importance of Christian principles underpinning British involvement. ‘The thing for which England is to stand to her children and before the bar of history is not simply political liberty and justice and constitutional government and international conscience, but the ‘Mind of Christ’ informing the life of her people, and giving political and moral ideals their true sanction. For that Force in the world, we are to stand or not stand at all’.

In 1917, he wrote ‘We shall not do much to promote the Great Cause of lofty principles and high ideals in the struggle with materialism, if in any way we encourage the belief that making shells or growing potatoes is national service while the ministrations of the Church and promoting moral welfare are not’.

Translated to Oxford in 1919,ex officio Chancellor of the Order of the Garter and appointed Clerk of the Closet, he was later also a Sub-Prelate of the Order of St John of Jerusalem and Chancellor of the Most Noble Order of the Garter.

He was a keen cricketer.

Burge was made a Knight Commander of the Royal Victorian Order in the 1925 Birthday Honours, days before he died in office on 11 June 1925.

Notes

1862 births
1925 deaths
People educated at Bedford School
People educated at Marlborough College
Fellows of University College, Oxford
Bishops of Southwark
Bishops of Oxford
Headmasters of Repton School
Headmasters of Winchester College
Clerks of the Closet
20th-century Church of England bishops
Chancellors of the Order of the Garter
Sub-Prelates of the Venerable Order of Saint John
Knights Commander of the Royal Victorian Order